Baroness Fabienne Claire Nothomb, better known by her pen name Amélie Nothomb (born 13 August 1967), is a Belgian Francophone novelist. Part of her childhood was spent in Asia.

A prolific author, since the publication of her first novel Hygiene and the Assassin in 1992, at the age of twenty-six, she has published a book a year. Her novels are among the top literary sales and have been translated into several languages. She is a Commander of the Order of the Crown and has had the title of Baroness bestowed upon her by King Philippe of Belgium. Her satirical novel about corporate life in Japan Fear and Trembling won the Grand Prix du roman de l'Académie française in 1999, and in 2015 she was elected to the Royal Academy of French Language and Literature in Belgium.

Biography 
Research shows Amélie Nothomb was born in Etterbeek, Brussels-Capital Region on 9 July 1966. As an artist, she has consistently claimed metaphorically to have been born in Kobe, Japan in 1967 while records show her living there only from ages two to five. Subsequently, she lived in China, New York, Bangladesh, Burma, the United Kingdom (Coventry) and Laos. She stems from a Belgian noble family. Her father was the Belgian diplomat Patrick Nothomb, and she is the grandniece of Charles-Ferdinand Nothomb, a Belgian foreign minister (1980–1981), and great granddaughter of writer and politician Pierre Nothomb. She has one brother and one sister.

While in Japan, Nothomb attended a local school and learned Japanese. When she was five, the family moved to China. She remarked in Fear and Trembling that leaving Japan was "a wrenching separation for me". She studied philology at the Université Libre de Bruxelles. Having finished her studies, Nothomb returned to Japan to work in a Japanese company in Tokyo. Her experience of this time is expressed in Fear and Trembling.

Nothomb's first novel, Hygiène de l'assassin, was published in 1992. Since then, she has published approximately one novel per year, including Les Catilinaires (1995), Fear and Trembling (1999) and Métaphysique des tubes (2000). She has been awarded numerous prizes, including the 1993 Prix Jacques-Chardonne, the 1999 Grand Prix du roman de l'Académie française, the Grand prix Jean Giono (2008), and since 2015 has been a member of the Belgium Royal Academy of French language and literature.

She wrote a romanticized biography (The Book of Proper Names) of French female singer Robert in 2002 and during the period 2000–2002 wrote the lyrics for nine tracks by the same artist.

A documentary — Amélie Nothomb: une vie entre deux eaux (a life between two waters) — co-written and directed by Laurelinne Amanieux and Luca Chiari, about Amélie's return to Japan and rediscovery of the beauty of the landscapes, the peaceful rites, the sadness of Fukushima, but especially, the meeting with her Japanese nursemaid, Nishio San was made in 2012.

By a Royal Decree of 8 July 2015, Nothomb was ennobled as a non-hereditary baroness.

Her novel Premier sang depicting the fictional memoirs of her father who had died 2020 and written in the first person won the Prix Renaudot 2021.

Works

Books 

Unless otherwise stated, all works were originally published in French by Éditions Albin Michel.

Adaptations

Film adaptations 
1999: Hygiène de l'assassin (Hygiene and the Assassin), French movie directed by François Ruggieri, with Jean Yanne (Prétextat Tach) and Barbara Schulz (Nina).
2003: Stupeur et tremblements (Fear and Trembling), French movie directed by Alain Corneau with Sylvie Testud (Amélie) and Kaori Tsuji (Fubuki).
2014: Tokyo Fiancée, Belgian movie directed by Stefan Liberski with Pauline Etienne (Amélie) and Taichi Inoue (Rinri)
2021: A Perfect Enemy (adaptation of the novel, Cosmétique de l'ennemi), French movie directed by Kike Maíllo.

Stage adaptations 
Le sabotage amoureux (English: Loving sabotage), Theater Le Ranelagh, Paris, 1999
With Valérie Mairesse, Pétronille de Saint-Rapt, Vanessa Jarry
Direction: Annabelle Milot
Le sabotage amoureux (Loving Sabotage), Theater Daniel-Sorano, Vincennes, 2003–2005
With Pauline Foschia, Jeanne Gougeau, Laurence Vielle
Adaptation et direction: Brigitte Bailleux, Laurence Vielle
Cosmétique de l'ennemi (The Enemy's Cosmetique), "La Compagnie des Sept Lieux", Suisse, 2003–2008
With John Durand and Olivier Renault
Adaptation and direction: Emmanuel Samatani and Jean-Daniel Uldry
Les combustibles (Human Rites), Theater Daniel-Sorano, Vincennes, March – April 2008
With Michel Boy, Julie Turin, Grégory Gerrebo
Direction: Stéphane Cottin
Métaphysique des tubes (The Character of Rain), 2007–2009
With Cécile Schletzer and Claire Rieussec
Direction: Claire Rieussec
Hygiène de l'assassin (Hygiene and the Assassin), Theater of Namur and Theater "le Public", Bruxelles, September – October 2008
With Daniel Hanssens, Nathalie Cornet, Valérie Marchand and Vincent Lécuyer
Direction: Pierre Santini
Biographie de la Faim (The Life of Hunger), Theater of "La Place des Martyrs", Bruxelles, April – May 2009
With Nathalie Cornet, Michel Hinderyckx, Jessica Gazon, Stéphanie Blanchoud...
Adaptation and direction: Christine Delmotte
Les Combustibles (Human Rites), Theater of Nesle, Paris, 16 September 2010 – 2 October 2010
With Philippe Doré, Freddy Zimmer, Florine Moreau
Direction: Hubert Vinzani
Stupeur et Tremblements (Fear and Trembling), Theater "Le Petit Hébértot", Paris, 18 March 2011 – 22 May 2011
With Layla Metssitane
Adaptation and direction: Layla Metssitane

Audio books 
Eight of Amélie Nothomb's novels were adapted in the form of audio books, four first ones were published by the editions "VDB", the others by "Audiolib" :
Robert des noms propres (=The Book of Proper Names): Amélie Nothomb (author) and Véronique Groux de Miéri (narrator), La Roque-sur-Pernes, "Éditions VDB", 1 March 2003 (Note BNF (FRENCH NATIONAL LIBRARY) no FRBNF39186856q). 
Support: 3 audio CD (lasted: 3:15 am min, complete text), ref. V.D.B. 008.
Antéchrista (=Antichrista): Amélie Nothomb (author) and Véronique Groux de Miéri (narrator), La Roque-sur-Pernes, "Éditions VDB", 1 March 2004 (Note BNF (FRENCH NATIONAL LIBRARY) no FRBNF412025642). 
Support: 3 audio CD (lasted: 2:52 am min, complete text), ref. V.D.B. 033. Musical illustration: Thierry Duhamel.
Biographie de la faim (=The life of hunger): Amélie Nothomb (author) and Véronique Groux de Miéri (narrator), La Roque-sur-Pernes, "Éditions VDB", 1 March 2005 (Note BNF (FRENCH NATIONAL LIBRARY) no FRBNF40227909h). 
Support: 4 audio CD (lasted: 4:17 am min, complete text), ref. V.D.B. 074. Musical illustration: Thierry Duhamel.
Acide sulfurique (=Sulphuric acid): Amélie Nothomb (author) and Véronique Groux de Miéri (narrator), La Roque-sur-Pernes, "Éditions VDB", 1 March 2006 (Note BNF (FRENCH NATIONAL LIBRARY) no FRBNF40227903f). 
Support: 3 audio CD (lasted: 5:39 am min, complete text), ref. V.D.B. 104. Musical illustration: Thierry Duhamel.
Ni d'Eve, ni d'Adam (=Tokyo Fiancée): Amélie Nothomb (author) and Sylvie Testud (narrator), Paris, "Audiolib", 13 February 2008 (Note BNF (FRENCH NATIONAL LIBRARY) no FRBNF412025642). 
Support: 1 audio CD (lasted: 3:50 am min, complete text), ref. Audiolib 25 0012 02.
Le fait du prince (=The prince's act): Amélie Nothomb (author) and Patrick Waleffe (narrator), Paris, "Audiolib", 21 January 2009 (Note BNF (FRENCH NATIONAL LIBRARY) no FRBNF414068348). 
Support: 1 audio CD (lasted: 3:00 am min, complete text), ref. Audiolib 25 0049 4.
Le voyage d'hiver (=The winter journey): Amélie Nothomb (author) and Thibault de Montalembert (narrator), Paris, "Audiolib", 9 September 2009 (Note BNF (FRENCH NATIONAL LIBRARY) no FRBNF42044512x). 
Support: 2 audio CD (lasted: 1:54 am min, complete text), ref. Audiolib 25 0129 4.
Une forme de vie (=A form of life): Amélie Nothomb (author) and Frédéric Meaux (narrator), Paris, "Audiolib", 13 October 2010 (Note BNF (FRENCH NATIONAL LIBRARY) no FRBNF42285807k). 
Support: 1 audio CD (lasted: 2:42 am min, complete text), ref. Audiolib 25 281 3.

Bibliography 
  Susan Bainbrigge and Jeanette Den Toonder, Amélie Nothomb, Authorship, Identity and Narrative Practice, Peter Lang, 2003. 
 (fr) Frédérique Chevillot, Amélie Nothomb : L'Invitation à la lecture. Women in French Studies, 2012, vol. 2012, no 1, .
 Mary Jane Cowles,  Close Encounters of the Abject Kind: The Intercultural Female Body in Amélie Nothomb's Japan.
 Amaleena Damlé, Making A Body without Organs: Amélie Nothomb's An-Organic Flux of Immanence, .
 (fr) Yolande Helm, Amélie Nothomb : une écriture alimentée à la source de l'orphisme. Religiologiques, Orphée et Eurydice : mythes en mutation, 1997, vol. 15, .
  Anna Kemp,  The Child as Artist in Amélie Nothomb's Robert des noms propres. French studies, 2012, vol. 66, no 1, pp. 54–67.
 Mark D. Lee, Les identités d'Amélie Nothomb : de l'invention médiatique aux fantasmes originaires, éd. Rodopi, 2010.
 (fr) Andrea Oberhuber,  Réécrire à l'ère du soupçon insidieux : Amélie Nothomb et le récit postmoderne. Études françaises, 2004, vol. 40, no 1, .
 Scott M Powers, Evil in Contemporary French and Francophone Literature, 2014.

References

External links 
 
  Amélie Nothomb website
 
 The guardian interview of Amélie Nothomb, Richard Lea
  Interview Threepercent Rochester edu.
 The Complete review, Amélie Nothomb
  amelienothomb.com , an Italian website & forum at Voland edizioni

1966 births
Living people
20th-century Belgian novelists
21st-century Belgian novelists
20th-century French non-fiction writers
21st-century French non-fiction writers
20th-century French women writers
21st-century French women writers
Postmodern writers
Belgian nobility
Université libre de Bruxelles alumni
Walloon people
Commanders of the Order of the Crown (Belgium)
Belgian writers in French
Belgian women writers
Grand Prix du roman de l'Académie française winners
Grand prix Jean Giono recipients
Prix Alain-Fournier winners
Members of the Académie royale de langue et de littérature françaises de Belgique
Prix Renaudot winners